Khadija Mosque is a mosque located in Heinersdorf, Pankow, Berlin. It is the property of the Ahmadiyya Muslim Community, and the first mosque in the former East Germany, opening on October 16, 2008. The mosque has a  minaret and can hold 500 worshippers. The mosque was financed by funds collected by Ahmadiyya women and the design was done by the architect Mubashra Ilyas.

Another mosque was built in Berlin between 1924 and 1928 by the Lahore Ahmadiyya Movement.

History
The Ahmadiyya Muslim Jamaat had already tried to build their first mosque in Europe in Berlin in the 1920s According to the wish of the second Khalifa the women of the community collected all the funds for the mosque from their own resources. However, due to the financial crisis in Germany the plan had to be given up. Instead, the money was used for the construction of the Fazl Mosque in London. Under the 100-Mosques-Plan of the community in Germany, the project was revived and a new mosque was planned in Berlin. The Khadija mosque is the first mosque in the eastern part of Berlin.

Construction
The foundation stone for the mosque was laid down on 2. January 2007 by the 5th Khalifa of the community, Mirza Masroor Ahmad. The mosque is built on a piece of land which is 4790 m² large. It consists of two stories. There are two prayer rooms, for 250 women and 250 men each. The mosque was designed by the architect of the community, Mubashra Ilyas. The construction was overseen by the architect company Pakdel. The dome of the mosque is 4.5 meter in height and has a diameter of 9 meters. The minaret of the mosque is 13 meter high. The costs for the construction of the mosque and a building for housing for the Imam and a "servant of the mosque" and offices were about €1.7 million.

See also

Islam in Germany
List of mosques in Europe

References

External links

 
Up to 400 protesters, one of which holds up a sign which reads “Islam means and is submission” took part in a demonstration against the building of the Ahmadiyya Mosque in the Heinersdorf district of Berlin 11 July 2007.
First Mosque in East Berlin Opens, CBN on October 20, 2008
First mosque opens in Germany’s ex-communist east, The Malaysian Insider on October 17, 2008
Europe's Mosques Move from Back Alleys to Boulevards, Spiegel, 15. October 2008
28-Jährige ist Moschee-Architektin, Morgenpost, 5 January 2007
Eastern Germany's First Mosque Opens Amid Protests, Deutsche Welle, 17. October 2008
Mobiles Beratungsteam »Ostkreuz«: Informationsseite zum Moscheebau in Heinersdorf
Khadija Mosque at night, Khadija Mosque at day

Ahmadiyya mosques in Germany
Mosques completed in 2008
Buildings and structures in Pankow
Mosque-related controversies in Europe
21st-century mosques
Mosques in Berlin
Mosque buildings with domes